Rhescyntis is a genus of moths in the family Saturniidae first described by Jacob Hübner in 1819.

Species
Rhescyntis colombiana Bouvier, 1927
Rhescyntis descimoni Lemaire, 1975
Rhescyntis gigantea Bouvier, 1930
Rhescyntis guianensis Bouvier, 1924
Rhescyntis hermes (W. Rothschild, 1907)
Rhescyntis hippodamia (Cramer, 1777)
Rhescyntis martii Perty, 1834
Rhescyntis norax Druce, 1897
Rhescyntis pomposa Draudt, 1930
Rhescyntis pseudomartii Lemaire, 1976
Rhescyntis reducta Becker & Camargo, 2001
Rhescyntis septentrionalis Vazquez, 1966

References

Arsenurinae